Mewes or Mewès is a surname. Notable people with the surname include:

Charles Mewès (1860–1914), French architect and designer
Valerie Mewes (1931–1955), English model
Marianne Mewes, German rower
Siegmund Mewes (born 1951), East German football player and manager
Jason Mewes (born 1974), American television and film actor, film producer and internet radio show host.
David Mewes (born 1976), German decathlete
William Mewes

See also
Mewis, surname

Surnames from given names
Low German surnames